Kevin Jordan may refer to:
Kevin Jordan (American football) (born 1972), American football player
Kevin Jordan (baseball) (born 1969), American baseball player
Kevin Jordan (fighter) (born 1970), American mixed martial artist
Kevin Jordan (filmmaker), director of the film Brooklyn Lobster